Flags and Emblems is the fifth studio album by the band Stiff Little Fingers, released in 1991 (see 1991 in music).

Track listing
All tracks composed by Jake Burns; except where indicated
"(It's a) Long Way to Paradise (From Here)" 
"Stand Up and Shout" (Dolphin Taylor, Burns)
"Each Dollar a Bullet" 
"The 'Cosh' " 
"Beirut Moon" 
"The Game of Life"
"Human Shield" 
"Johnny 7" (Henry Cluney)
"Die and Burn" 
"No Surrender"

Personnel
Stiff Little Fingers
Jake Burns	         - 	vocals, guitar
Dolphin Taylor	         - 	drums
Henry Cluney	 - 	guitar
Bruce Foxton	 - 	bass guitar
with:
Rory Gallagher      -      slide guitar on "Human Shield"
Lee Brilleaux - harmonica on "(It's a) Long Way to Paradise (From Here)"
Jon Snow - announcer voice on "Beirut Moon"
Technical
Brian Burrows - sleeve design

References

1991 albums
Stiff Little Fingers albums
Works about The Troubles (Northern Ireland)